The 2021 Modern Pentathlon Youth World Championships was held from 12 to 19 September 2021 in Alexandria, Egypt. It was the inaugural edition of the competition.

Medal table

Medal summary

Men's U17

Women's U17

Mixed U17

Men's U19

Women's U19

Mixed U19

References

Modern pentathlon competitions
World Championships
2021 in Egyptian sport
International sports competitions hosted by Egypt
Sport in Alexandria
World Youth Modern Pentathlon Championships